Michael Conrad was an American actor perhaps best known for his portrayal of veteran cop Sgt. Phil Esterhaus on Hill Street Blues.

Michael Conrad may also refer to:

 Michael Conrad (biologist), American theoretical biologist
 Michael Georg Conrad, German writer and philosopher
 Michael J. Conrad,  retired United States Army major general